is a role-playing simulation video game developed and published by Marvelous. The first entry in the Rune Factory series since 2012's Rune Factory 4, it was released for the Nintendo Switch in Japan in May 2021 and worldwide by Xseed Games in 2022, including a Windows port.

Plot
A hero loses their memory and ends up joining SEED, a group of rangers operating in the small town of Rigbarth. The hero is encouraged to tend the land and complete tasks for the townspeople, as well as battle monsters in order to maintain the peace. Players control a male or female character named Ares and Alice by default, although they are able to freely rename them.

Gameplay

As with previous games in the series, gameplay features the ability to farm and tame monsters. Players can also form social connections with the game's townfolks, including ones with bachelors or bachelorettes leading to marriage.

Development
Following the success of Rune Factory 4, series producer Yoshifumi Hashimoto commented that the development of a sequel was expected. However, after Rune Factory developer Neverland Co. declared bankruptcy in 2013, the future of the series was left uncertain. In 2014, Marvelous AQL stated that they had hired former Rune Factory developers, including Hashimoto, to develop Lord of Magna: Maiden Heaven. Hashimoto left his executive officer role in 2018 and opened a new studio under Marvelous called Hakama, where he went to work on Rune Factory 4 Special and Rune Factory 5.

The game was announced in February 2019 and was planned to be released in 2020 before being delayed. It was released in Japan on May 20, 2021, in North America on March 22, 2022, and in Europe three days later. A Windows version was released on July 13, 2022.

For the first time in the series, players can marry characters of the same sex. This feature was not available in the original Japanese version of the game and was added for the global release, although it was patched into the Japanese version later.

Reception 

Rune Factory 5 received "mixed or average" reviews, according to review aggregator Metacritic. It was praised for its combat system, gameplay, and characters, but criticized for its graphics and a lack of innovation to the series' formula. The Switch version was also criticized for its technical performance.

Sales 
In Japan, the Nintendo Switch version of Rune Factory 5 debuted with 102,853 physical copies sold, making it the bestselling retail game during its first week of release.. Total worldwide shipments and digital sales surpassed 500,000 copies .

Notes

References

External links

2021 video games
Marvelous Entertainment
Nintendo Switch games
Windows games
Role-playing video games
Rune Factory
Simulation video games
Single-player video games
Video games developed in Japan
Video games featuring protagonists of selectable gender
Xseed Games games